The following lists the top 25 singles of 2007  in Australia from the Australian Recording Industry Association (ARIA) End of Year Singles Chart.
"Big Girls Don't Cry" by Fergie was the biggest song of the year, peaking at #1 for nine weeks and staying in the top 50 for 32 weeks; it also had the longest stay at #1.

*5 weeks in 2007, and 3 in 2008

References 

Australian record charts
2007 in Australian music
Australia Top 25 Singles